The LeMoine Building is a historic commercial building in the unincorporated community of Gheen, Minnesota, United States.  It was built in 1913.  In 1989 it was listed  on the National Register of Historic Places for its local significance in the theme of commerce.  It was nominated for being one of northern Minnesota's few surviving examples of the once-common false-fronted commercial building and the most intact historic building in the lumber-era townsite of Gheen.

See also
 National Register of Historic Places listings in St. Louis County, Minnesota

References

1913 establishments in Minnesota
Buildings and structures in St. Louis County, Minnesota
Commercial buildings completed in 1913
Commercial buildings on the National Register of Historic Places in Minnesota
National Register of Historic Places in St. Louis County, Minnesota